Trapper Peak is the highest point in the Bitterroot Mountains, part of the larger Bitterroot Range in western Montana.

The peak is located within the Central Bitterroot Range, a subrange of the Bitterroot Mountains and within the Selway-Bitterroot Wilderness Area of the Bitterroot National Forest.

A trail to the peak climbs  from the end of a Forest Service road.

References

External links 
 
 

Bitterroot Range
Mountains of Montana
Mountains of Ravalli County, Montana
Bitterroot National Forest